Justin Michael Freeman (born October 22, 1986) is an American former professional baseball pitcher. He has played in Major League Baseball (MLB) for the Cincinnati Reds.

Professional career
Freeman was drafted by the Cincinnati Reds in the 32nd round of the 2008 Major League Baseball Draft out Kennesaw State University. He was called up to the majors for the first time on April 15, 2013. Freeman made his Major League debut on April 17, 2013 versus the Philadelphia Phillies, giving up 2 earned runs in 1 inning of relief pitching. He was designated for assignment on August 30, 2013. He became a free agent after the 2014 season.

References

External links

1986 births
Living people
Baseball players from Georgia (U.S. state)
Billings Mustangs players
Carolina Mudcats players
Cincinnati Reds players
Leones del Caracas players
American expatriate baseball players in Venezuela
Louisville Bats players
Lynchburg Hillcats players
Kennesaw State Owls baseball players
Kennesaw State University alumni
Pensacola Blue Wahoos players
Sarasota Reds players
Sportspeople from Macon, Georgia